Andrew Jackson Knox (January 6, 1864 – September 14, 1940) was a Major League Baseball first baseman.

He died on September 14, 1940 and was interred at Lawnview Memorial Park in Rockledge, Pennsylvania.

References

External links

Major League Baseball first basemen
Philadelphia Athletics (AA) players
Baseball players from Pennsylvania
1864 births
1940 deaths
Lancaster Ironsides players
Wilmington Peach Growers players
Hazleton Pugilists players
Davenport Pilgrims players
Allentown-Bethlehem Colts players
York (minor league baseball) players
19th-century baseball players